Kolofata is a town and commune in Cameroon.

Boko Haram Attacks
On January 12, 2015 a military base in Kolofata was assaulted by Boko Haram. The Islamist group had attacked towns in Northern Cameroon in December 2014 The attack was repelled with only one Cameroonian officer killed. 143 Boko Haram insurgents were killed by the Cameroonian Army.

Another attack was reported in 2017.

See also
Communes of Cameroon

Notes

References
 Site de la primature - Élections municipales 2002 
 Contrôle de gestion et performance des services publics communaux des villes camerounaises - Thèse de Donation Avele, Université Montesquieu Bordeaux IV 
 Charles Nanga, La réforme de l’administration territoriale au Cameroun à la lumière de la loi constitutionnelle n° 96/06 du 18 janvier 1996, Mémoire ENA. 

Communes of Far North Region (Cameroon)